The Cutty Sark is a tea clipper ship built in Scotland, now in permanent dry dock at Greenwich, London 

Cutty Sark may also refer to:

Cutty Sark (whisky), a brand of Scotch whisky
"Cutty Sark" (short story), a short story by Ivan Yefremov
Cutty-sark (witch), a character created by Robert Burns in Tam o' Shanter
Cutty Sark (pub), a pub in Greenwich, London
Cutty Sark (yacht), a private yacht belong to the Duke of Westminster and used in submarine escort duties during World War II
Saro Cutty Sark, a British flying boat of the 1920s
Cutty Sark DLR station, a station on the Docklands Light Railway, near the ship

See also
Chemise 
Cuttie-stool
Cutty (disambiguation)
Sark (disambiguation)